Mr. Smith is the sixth studio album by American hip hop recording artist LL Cool J, released on November 21, 1995, by Def Jam. The album has been certified Double Platinum in the US by the RIAA.

Overview
Mr. Smith was produced by Rashad Smith, Chyskillz, Chad Eliott, Trackmasters and Easy Mo Bee. Artists such as  The Emotions, Terri & Monica, Boyz II Men, Fat Joe, Keith Murray, Prodigy of Mobb Deep and Foxy Brown also made guest appearances on the album.

Critical reception

Mr. Smith garnered positive reviews from music critics who found it a return to form after the Mama Said Knock You out-influenced 14 Shots to the Dome flopped. AllMusic's Stephen Thomas Erlewine praised the album for working more towards LL's romantic side that while toned down remains sexually invigorating, concluding that "Mr. Smith isn't a perfect record – there are too many slack moments for it to qualify as one of his best – but it proves that LL Cool J remained vital a decade after his debut."   Robert Christgau cited "Doin' It" as a "choice cut", indicating a good song on "an album that isn't worth your time or money." Mike Flaherty of Entertainment Weekly praised the album for balancing the various personas LL adopts throughout the tracks, concluding that "while his cutting-edge days are well behind him, this is far from the self-parodying effort we had every reason to expect." Cheo H. Coker of Rolling Stone also praised the album for delivering both hardcore rap songs and love ballads that contain great production and lyrical dexterity. But Coker noted that tracks like "No Airplay" and "Get da Drop on 'Em" showcase LL better as a tough lyric spitter, concluding with, "Maybe one day LL will realize that it's his electrifying flow, not his Casanova aspirations, that have made him a rap superstar for 10 years running."

Track listing

Notes
 "No Airplay" was edited on both the edited and explicit versions of the album. The explicit version only backmasks on the song, while the edited version even edits the intro. 
 "Hollis to Hollywood" is sampled from his verse of Craig Mack's "Flava In Ya Ear (Remix)" on the chorus.

Sample Credits
 "Make It Hot" contains a sample from "I Like It", written by El DeBarge/Randy DeBarge/Bunny DeBarge and performed by DeBarge.
 "Hip Hop" contains a sample of "Tell Me If You Still Care", written by James Harris/Terry Lewis and performed by The S.O.S. Band.
 "Hey Lover" contains a sample of "The Lady in My Life", written by Rod Temperton and performed by Michael Jackson.
 "Doin' It" contains a sample of "My Jamaican Guy", written and performed by Grace Jones.
 "I Shot Ya" contains a sample of "Put It on the Line", written by James Brown/Lyn Collins and performed by Lyn Collins.
 "Mr. Smith" contains a sample of "What a Night", written and performed by Hubert Laws.
 "No Airplay" contains a sample of "Blessed", written by Maurice White/Jerry Peters and performed by The Emotions.
 "Loungin" contains an interpolation of "Nite and Day", written by Albert Joseph Brown III/Kyle West.
 "Hollis to Hollywood" contains a sample of "The Look of Love", written by Burt Bacharach/Hal David and performed by Isaac Hayes.
 "God Bless" contains a sample of "Message from the Soul Sisters", written by James Brown and performed by Myra Barnes.

Charts

Weekly charts

Year-end charts

Certifications

References

LL Cool J albums
1995 albums
Def Jam Recordings albums
Albums produced by Rashad Smith
Albums produced by Easy Mo Bee
Albums produced by Trackmasters